Virginia Ruano Pascual and Paola Suárez were defending champions, and won in the final 6–4, 7–5, against Svetlana Kuznetsova and Elena Likhovtseva.

Seeds

  Virginia Ruano Pascual /  Paola Suárez (champions)
  Svetlana Kuznetsova /  Elena Likhovtseva (finals)
  Cara Black /  Rennae Stubbs (third round)
  Nadia Petrova /  Meghann Shaughnessy (second round)
  Martina Navratilova /  Lisa Raymond (quarterfinals)
  Janette Husárová /  Conchita Martínez (quarterfinals)
  Liezel Huber /  Tamarine Tanasugarn (quarterfinals)
  Anastasia Myskina /  Vera Zvonareva (first round)
  Marion Bartoli /  Myriam Casanova (first round)
  Émilie Loit /  Nicole Pratt (third round)
  María Vento-Kabchi /  Angelique Widjaja (first round)
  Barbara Schett /  Patty Schnyder (semifinals)
  Alicia Molik /  Magüi Serna (first round)
  Silvia Farina Elia /  Francesca Schiavone (second round)
  Elena Dementieva /  Ai Sugiyama (semifinals)
  Els Callens /  Petra Mandula (first round)

Draw

Finals

Top half

Section 1

Section 2

Bottom half

Section 3

Section 4

External links
WTA Tour Draw
2004 US Open – Women's draws and results at the International Tennis Federation

Women's Doubles
US Open (tennis) by year – Women's doubles
2004 in women's tennis
2004 in American women's sports